Daniele Callegarin (born 21 September 1982 in Cuggiono) is an Italian former cyclist.

Palmares
2008
2nd Banja Luka-Belgrade I
3rd Banja Luka-Belgrade II
2009
1st GP Industria & Artigianato di Larciano
2nd Giro del Mendrisiotto
2nd Gran Premio Industria e Commercio Artigianato Carnaghese
3rd Overall Szlakiem Grodów Piastowskich
1st Stage 1

References

1982 births
Living people
Italian male cyclists
People from Cuggiono
Cyclists from the Metropolitan City of Milan